The 22nd annual Australian Recording Industry Association Music Awards (generally known as ARIA Music Awards or simply The ARIAs) took place on 19 October 2008. The nominees for all categories were announced on 10 September, while the winners of the Artisan Awards were announced on the same day.

Awards and nominations
Final nominees are shown in plain, with winners in bold.

ARIA Awards
Album of the Year
The Presets – Apocalypso
Geoffrey Gurrumul Yunupingu – Gurrumul
Kasey Chambers & Shane Nicholson – Rattlin' Bones
Nick Cave and the Bad Seeds – Dig, Lazarus, Dig!!!
The Living End – White Noise

Single of the Year
Gabriella Cilmi – "Sweet About Me"
Faker – "This Heart Attack"
Sam Sparro  – "Black and Gold"
The Living End – "White Noise"
The Presets – "My People"

Best Male Artist
Nick Cave – Dig, Lazarus, Dig!!!
Geoffrey Gurrumul Yunupingu – Gurrumul
Paul Kelly – To Her Door (live)
Pete Murray – Summer at Eureka
Sam Sparro  – Sam Sparro

Best Female Artist
Gabriella Cilmi – Lessons to Be Learned
Clare Bowditch – The Moon Looked On
Holly Throsby – A Loud Call
Kylie Minogue – X
Missy Higgins – "Peachy"

Best Group
The Presets – Apocalypso
Angus & Julia Stone – A Book Like This
Faker – Be the Twilight
Silverchair – "If You Keep Losing Sleep"
The Living End – White Noise

Best Adult Contemporary Album
The Panics  – Cruel Guards
Clare Bowditch – The Moon Looked On
Jimmy Barnes – Out in the Blue
Katie Noonan – Skin
Robert Forster – The Evangelist

Best Blues & Roots Album
The Audreys – When the Flood Comes
Angus & Julia Stone – A Book Like This
Jeff Lang – Half Seas Over
Mia Dyson – Struck Down
The Waifs – Sun Dirt Water

Best Children's Album
The Wiggles – You Make Me Feel Like Dancing
Hi-5 – Planet Earth (deluxe edition)
Jay Laga'aia – Come Dance and Sing
Justine Clarke – Songs to Make You Smile
The Fairies – Fairy Fun, Fun, Fun

Best Comedy Release
Shaun Micallef – The Expurgated Micallef Tonight
Akmal Saleh – Akmal Live and Uncensored
Matt Tilley – Cereal Pest: Gotcha Calls – Three's a Crowd
Merrick and Rosso – Live and Totally Wrong!
The Umbilical Brothers – Don't Explain

Best Country Album
Kasey Chambers & Shane Nicholson – Rattlin' Bones
Catherine Britt – Little Wildflower
Melinda Schneider – Be Yourself
Sara Storer – Silver Skies
The McClymonts – Chaos and Bright Lights

Best Dance Release
The Presets – Apocalypso
Cut Copy – In Ghost Colours
Mobin Master – Show Me Love
Pnau – Pnau
The Potbelleez – "Don't Hold Back"

Best Independent Release
Geoffrey Gurrumul Yunupingu – Gurrumul
Ben Lee – Ripe
British India – Thieves
Lior – Corner of an Endless Road
Midnight Juggernauts – Dystopia

Best Music DVD
Powderfinger & Silverchair – Across the Great Divide Tour
Hilltop Hoods – The City of Light
Paul Kelly – Live Apples
John Butler Trio – Live at Federation Square
Wolfmother – Please Experience Wolfmother Live

Best Pop Release
Gabriella Cilmi – Lessons to Be Learned
Kylie Minogue – X
Operator Please – Yes Yes Vindictive
Sam Sparro  – "Black and Gold"
The Veronicas – Hook Me Up

Best Rock Album
The Living End – White Noise
Eddy Current Suppression Ring – Primary Colours
Faker – Be the Twilight
Gyroscope – Breed Obsession
Nick Cave and the Bad Seeds – Dig, Lazarus, Dig!!!

Best Urban Release
Bliss n Eso – Flying Colours
A-Love – Ace of Hearts
Katalyst – What's Happening
Muph & Plutonic – …And Then Tomorrow Came
Spit Syndicate – Towards the Light
The Herd – Summerland

Breakthrough Artist – Album
Gabriella Cilmi – Lessons to Be Learned
Angus & Julia Stone – A Book Like This
Midnight Juggernauts – Dystopia
Operator Please – Yes Yes Vindictive
Sam Sparro  – Sam Sparro

Breakthrough Artist – Single
Gabriella Cilmi – "Sweet About Me"
Angus & Julia Stone – "The Beast"
Sam Sparro  – "Black and Gold"
The Panics  – "Don't Fight It"
The Potbelleez – "Don't Hold Back"

Highest Selling Album
Delta Goodrem – Delta
David Campbell – The Swing Sessions 2
Guy Sebastian – The Memphis Album
The Veronicas – Hook Me Up
Tina Arena – Songs of Love & Loss

Highest Selling Single
Gabriella Cilmi – "Sweet About Me"
Delta Goodrem – "In This Life"
The Potbelleez – "Don't Hold Back"
The Veronicas – "Untouched"
The Veronicas – "Hook Me Up"

Fine Arts Awards
Best Classical Album
Richard Tognetti, Neal Peres da Costa, Daniel Yeadon – Bach Sonatas for Violin & Keyboard
Sydney Symphony Orchestra – Brett Dean
Elena Kats-Chernin – Slow Food
Roger Woodward – Johann Sebastian Bach: Chromatic Fantasia & Fugue, Partita no. 2 & Partita no. 6
Slava Grigoryan, Tasmanian Symphony Orchestra – Baroque Guitar Concertos

Best Jazz Album
Andrea Keller – Footprints
Deni Hines & James Morrison – The Other Woman
Grace Knight – Willow
Joe Chindamo – Duende the Romantic Project
Mike Nock Project – Meeting of the Waters
Jamie Oehlers, Paul Grabowsky, David Beck – Lost and Found

Best Original Soundtrack / Cast / Show Album
Chris Lilley – Summer Heights High soundtrack
Cezary Skubiszewski – Night – original soundtrack
Cast – Priscilla Queen of the Desert – the Musical
The Square – The Square soundtrack
Various – Countdown Spectacular 2

Best World Album
Geoffrey Gurrumul Yunupingu – Gurrumul
Archie Roach – Journey
David Jones – Colours of the Drum
Joseph Tawadros – Angel
Watussi – Tequila Sangre Fuego

Artisan Awards
The Artisan Award winners were announced on 10 September. The winners are shown here in bold.

Producer of the Year
The Presets (Julian Hamilton & Kim Moyes) – The Presets – Apocalypso
Harry Vanda & Glenn Goldsmith – British India – Thieves
Matt Lovell / Shihad – Shihad – Beautiful Machine
Michael Hohnen – Geoffrey Gurrumul Yunupingu – Gurrumul
Scott Horscroft – The Panics – Cruel Guards

Engineer of the Year
Matt Lovell / Shihad – Shihad – Beautiful Machine
Anthony Lycenko – Pete Murray – Summer at Eureka
James Ash – Rogue Traders – Better in the Dark
Scott Horscroft – The Panics – Cruel Guards
Scott Horscroft – The Presets – Apocalypso

Best Cover Art
Jonathan Zawada – The Presets – Apocalypso
Aaron Hayward & David Homer (Debaser) – Faker – Be the Twilight
Aaron Hayward & David Homer (Debaser) – Kasey Chambers & Shane Nicholson – Rattlin' Bones
Alter – Cut Copy – In Ghost Colours
IOSHVA – Angus & Julia Stone – A Book Like This

Best Video
Kris Moyes – The Presets – "My People"
Adam Callen – Sneaky Sound System – "Kansas City"
Angus & Julia Stone / Josh Groom – Angus & Julia Stone – "Just a Boy"
Damon Escott & Stephen Lance – Silverchair – "If You Keep Losing Sleep"
James Littlemore – Pnau – "Baby"

ARIA Hall Of Fame Inductees
The following were inducted into the 2008 ARIA Hall of Fame on 1 July:
 Rolf Harris
 Russell Morris
 Dragon
 Max Merritt
 The Triffids

References

External links
ARIA Awards 2008 official website
List of winners and nominees

ARIA Music Awards
2008 in Australian music
2008 music awards